Hartley Power (14 March 1894 – 29 January 1966) was an American-born British film and television actor, who made his Broadway debut in Dolly Jordan in 1922.  He is best remembered for two roles: "Sylvester Kee" the ventriloquist who is shot and almost killed by "Maxwell Frere" (Michael Redgrave) as a rival for his dummy's "affections" in Dead of Night and Mr. Hennessy, the chief of the news agency that Gregory Peck worked for in Roman Holiday.

He died in a Brighton nursing home on 29 January 1966 aged 71.

Filmography

Film

References

External links

1894 births
1966 deaths
20th-century American male actors
American emigrants to the United Kingdom